The culture of Indonesia has been shaped by long interaction between original indigenous customs and multiple foreign influences. Indonesia is centrally-located along ancient trading routes between the Far East, South Asia and the Middle East, resulting in many cultural practices being strongly influenced by a multitude of religions, including Buddhism, Christianity, Confucianism, Hinduism, and Islam, all strong in the major trading cities. The result is a complex cultural mixture, often different from the original indigenous cultures.

Examples of the fusion of Islam with Hinduism include Javanese Abangan belief. Balinese dances have stories about ancient Buddhist and Hindu kingdoms, while Islamic art forms and architecture are present in Sumatra, especially in the Minangkabau and Aceh regions. Traditional art, music and sport are combined in a martial art form called Pencak Silat.

The Western world has influenced Indonesia in science, technology and modern entertainment such as television shows, film and music, as well as political system and issues. India has notably influenced Indonesian songs and movies. A popular type of song is the Indian-rhythmical dangdut, which is often mixed with Arab and Malay folk music.

Despite the influences of foreign culture, some remote Indonesian regions still preserve uniquely indigenous culture. Indigenous ethnic groups Mentawai, Asmat, Dani, Dayak, Toraja and many others are still practising their ethnic rituals, customs and wearing traditional clothes.

Traditional performing arts

Music

Indonesia is home to with those from the islands of Java, Sumatra and Bali being frequently recorded. The traditional music of West, Central, and East Java and Bali is the gamelan (traditional instruments include: gambang, bonang, saron, kenong, gong, and many more). Gamelan has been recognized as a Masterpiece of the Oral and Intangible Heritage of Humanity by UNESCO (United Nations Educational, Scientific and Cultural Organization).

On 29 June 1965, Koes Plus, a leading Indonesian pop group in the 1960s, 1970s and 1980s, was imprisoned in Glodok, West Jakarta, for playing Western-style music. After the resignation of President Sukarno, the law was rescinded, and in the 1970s the Glodok prison was dismantled and replaced with a large shopping mall.

Kroncong is a musical genre that uses guitars and ukulele as the main musical instruments. This genre had its roots in Portugal and was introduced by Portuguese traders in the 15th century. There is a traditional Keroncong Tugu music group in North Jakarta and other traditional Keroncong music groups in Maluku, with strong Portuguese influences. This music genre was popular in the first half of the 20th century; a contemporary form of Kroncong is called Pop Kroncong.

Angklung musical orchestra, native of West Java, received international recognition as UNESCO has listed the traditional West Java musical instrument made from bamboo in the list of intangible cultural heritage.

The soft Sasando music from the province of East Nusa Tenggara in West Timor is completely different. Sasando uses an instrument made from a split leaf of the Lontar palm (Borassus flabellifer), which bears some resemblance to a harp.

Dance

Indonesian dance reflects the diversity of culture from ethnic groups that composed the nation of Indonesia.
Austronesian roots and Melanesian tribal dance forms are visible, and influences ranging from neighbouring Asian countries; such as India, China, and Middle East to European western styles through colonization. Each ethnic group has its own distinct dances; makes total dances in Indonesia are more than 3000 Indonesian original dances. However, the dances of Indonesia can be divided into three eras; the Prehistoric Era, the Hindu/Buddhist Era, and the Era of Islam, and into two genres; court dance and folk dance.

There is a continuum in the traditional dances depicting episodes from the Ramayana and Mahabharata from India, ranging through Thailand, all the way to Bali. There is a marked difference, though, between the highly stylized dances of the courts of Yogyakarta and Surakarta and their popular variations. While the court dances are promoted and even performed internationally, the popular forms of dance art and drama must largely be discovered locally.

Reog Ponorogo is also a dance that originated from the district Ponorogo, East Java, which is a visualization of the legendary story Wengker kingdom and the kingdom of Kediri.

A popular line dance called Poco-poco was originated in Indonesia and also popular in Malaysia, but at early April 2011 Malaysian Islamic clerics banned the poco-poco dance for Muslims due to them believing it is traditionally a Christian dance and that its steps make the sign of the cross.

During the Intergovernmental Committee for the Safeguarding of the Intangible Cultural Heritage convention in 29 November to 4 December 2015 in Windhoek, Namibia, UNESCO recognizes three genres of traditional dance in Bali, Indonesia, as Intangible cultural heritage. The three genres includes Wali (sacred dances), Bebali (semi-sacred dances) and Balih-balihan (dances for entertainment purposes). Balinese dance has been proposed since 2011, and officially recognized in 2015.

Previously, on 24 November, 2011, UNESCO officially recognized Aceh's traditional Saman dance as an Intangible Cultural Heritage in Need of Urgent Safeguarding.

Drama and theatre

The Wayang show, the Javanese, Sundanese, and Balinese shadow puppet theatre shows display several mythological legends such as Ramayana, Mahabharata, and many more. Wayang Orang is a Javanese traditional dance drama based on wayang stories. Various Balinese dance drama also can be included within the traditional form of Indonesian drama. Another form of local drama is Javanese Ludruk and Ketoprak, Sundanese Sandiwara, and Betawi Lenong and Ondel-ondel. All of these dramas incorporated humour and jest, often involving audiences in their performance.

The shadow puppets are mostly made of sheets of certain items. You can make yours using wax paper and a sheet of translucent plastic, and download templates but those people really do have the talent to craft their own and one-of-a-kind shadow puppets, which are carved one by one segment out of metal or other special materials.

UNESCO designated Wayang the flat leather shadow puppet (wayang kulit) and the three-dimensional wooden puppet (wayang golek or wayang klitik) theatre, as a Masterpiece of the Oral and Intangible Heritage of Humanity on 7 November 2003. In return for the acknowledgement, UNESCO required Indonesians to preserve the tradition.

Randai is a folk theatre tradition of the Minangkabau people of West Sumatra, usually performed for traditional ceremonies and festivals. It incorporates music, singing, dance, drama and the silat martial art, with performances often based on semi-historical Minangkabau legends and love story.

Bangsawan is a Malay folk theatre found in the province of Riau.

Modern performing art also developed in Indonesia with its distinct style of drama. Notable theatre, dance, and drama troupe such as Teater Koma are gaining popularity in Indonesia as their drama often portray social and political satires of Indonesian society.

Martial arts

The art of Pencak Silat was created and firstly developed in the islands of Java and Sumatra. It is an art for survival and practised throughout the Indonesian archipelago. Centuries of tribal wars in Indonesian history had shaped silat as it was used by the ancient warriors of Indonesia. Silat was used to determine the rank and position of warriors in old Indonesian kingdoms.

Pencak Silat is recognized as a Masterpiece of the Oral and Intangible Heritage of Humanity by UNESCO (United Nations Educational, Scientific and Cultural Organization) on 12 December 2019.

Contacts with Indians and Chinese has further enriched silat. Silat reached areas beyond Indonesia mainly through the diaspora of Indonesian people. People from various regions like Aceh, Minangkabau, Riau, Bugis, Makassar, Java, Banjar, etc. moved into and settled in Malay Peninsula and other islands. They brought silat and passed it down to their descendants. The Indonesian of half-Dutch descent are also credited as the first to have brought the art into Europe.

Silat was used by Indonesian independence fighters during their struggle against the Dutch colonial rule. Unfortunately, after Indonesia achieving their independence, silat became less popular among Indonesian youth compare to foreign martial arts like Karate and Taekwondo. This probably because silat was not taught openly and only passed down among blood relatives, the other reason is the lack of media portrayal of the art.

Efforts have been made to introduce and reintroduce the beauty of silat to Indonesian youth and the world. Exhibitions and promotions by individuals as well as state-sponsored groups helped the growing of silat's popularity, particularly in Europe and United States. Indonesian 2009 Silat movie Merantau is one of Indonesian efforts to introduce silat to the international scene.

Another martial art from Indonesia is Tarung Derajat. It is a modern combat system created by Haji Ahmad Drajat based on his experience as a street fighter. Tarung Drajat has been acknowledged as a national sport by KONI in 1998 and is now used by Indonesian Army as part of their basic training.

In Eastern Indonesia, there is a type of martial art hitting with a whip or stick. Caci is a form of fighting with a whip or stick. It appears to be indigenous to Flores in East Nusa Tenggara, but it is also practised in Bali and Lombok.

Traditional visual arts

Painting

One of the oldest cave paintings in the world dating back more than 44,000 years old (art of the Upper Paleolithic), was found in  caves in the district of Maros (Sulawesi, Indonesia). The oldest types of cave painting are hand stencils and simple geometric shapes.

In 2018, scientists reported the discovery of the then-oldest known figurative art painting, over 40,000 (perhaps as old as 52,000) years old, of an unknown animal, in the cave of Lubang Jeriji Saléh on the Indonesian island of Borneo. In December 2019, however, figurative cave paintings depicting pig hunting in the Maros-Pangkep karst in Sulawesi were estimated to be even older, at at least 43,900 years old. The finding was noted to be "the oldest pictorial record of storytelling and the earliest figurative artwork in the world".

Indonesian painting before the 19th century is mostly restricted to the decorative arts, considered to be a religious and spiritual activity, comparable to the pre-1400 European art. Artists' names are anonymous since the individual human creator was seen as far less important than their creation to honour the deities or spirits. Some examples are the Kenyah decorative art, based on endemic natural motifs such as ferns and hornbills, found decorating the walls of Kenyah longhouses. Another notable traditional art is the geometric Toraja wood carvings. Balinese paintings are initially the narrative images to depict scenes of Balinese legends and religious scripts. The classical Balinese paintings are often decorating the lontar manuscripts and also the ceilings of temples pavilion.

Under the influence of the Dutch colonial power, a trend toward Western-style painting emerged in the 19th century. In the Netherlands, the term "Indonesian Painting" is applied to the paintings produced by Dutch or other foreign artists who lived and worked in the former Netherlands-Indies. The most famous indigenous 19th-century Indonesian painter is Raden Saleh (1807–1877), the first indigenous artist to study in Europe. His art is heavily influenced by Romanticism. In the 1920s Walter Spies settled in Bali, he is often credited with attracting the attention of Western cultural figures to Balinese culture and art. His works have somehow influenced Balinese artists and painters. Today Bali has one of the most vivid and richest painting traditions in Indonesia.

The 1920s to 1940s were a time of growing nationalism in Indonesia. The previous period of the romanticism movement was not seen as a purely Indonesian movement and did not develop. Painters began to see the natural world for inspiration. Some examples of Indonesian painter during this period are the Balinese Ida Bagus Made and the realist Basuki Abdullah. The Indonesian Painters Association (Persatuan Ahli-Ahli Gambar Indonesia or PERSAGI, 1938–1942) was formed during this period. PERSAGI established a contemporary art philosophy that saw artworks as reflections of the artist's individual or personal view as well as an expression of national cultural thoughts.

Wood carvings

The art of wood carving is quite well-developed in Indonesia. Other than tribal art woodcarvings of Asmat, Batak, Dayak, Nias, and Toraja area is well known for its refined wood carving culture; they are Jepara in Central Java and Bali. Mas village near Ubud in Bali is renowned for its wood carving art. Balinese woodcarving today has a sustained tourist market in Bali.

In Papua, Asmat art consists of elaborate stylized wood carvings such as the bisj pole and is designed to honour ancestors. Many Asmat artefacts have been collected by the world's museums, among the most notable of which are those found in the Michael C. Rockefeller Collection at the Metropolitan Museum of Art in New York City and the Tropenmuseum in Amsterdam. Bisj poles are carved by Asmat religious carvers (wow-ipits) after a member of their tribe or community had been killed and headhunted by an enemy tribe. Carved out of a single piece of a wild mangrove tree, Bisj poles can reach heights of up to 25 feet (7.62 m). Their carvings depict human figures standing on top of each other, as well as animal figures, phallic symbols, and carvings in the shape of a canoe prow. The Asmat participated in headhunting raids and cannibalism as rituals, many rituals involved the Bisj poles, including dancing, masquerading, singing and headhunting—all performed by men.

In North Sumatra, the people of Nias placed great value on wooden figures or adu. The sole purpose of the Nias figures was to fulfil ritual needs, whether it is to ensure wealth or to perform specific beneficial rite. Niassan figures vary in size, from as small as 20 centimetres (7.9 in) in height to more than 2 metres (6.6 ft) tall. When an elderly person died, the family would make a wooden statue known as adu zatua. The statue was unveiled on the fourth day after the death of the person. The shape of the wooden statue reflects the status of the person who used them: the more powerful the owner, the more impressive the statue will be made. Nias people believed that the deceased person's spirits reside in the statue, so all events that occurred in the family were shared with the ancestor statues through prayers. Ancestor statues were placed in the main room of the house, sometimes more than a hundred. A missionary work in 1930 had recorded the removal of 'over 2000 "idols" from a house of new northern convert.' Some missionaries even recorded houses collapsing under the weight of these ancestor figures. Small adu zatua were bound together horizontally using a rattan and pegs.

Many ancestor figures were destroyed in 1916 by Christian missionary movements which saw them as an old blasphemous religious symbol. Some were sold to collectors and can be found in museum or private collections around the world.

In Sulawesi, Torajans carve wood, calling it Pa'ssura (or "the writing"). One of the Toraja wood carvings is Tau tau, Tau tau is a kind of human statue made of wood or bamboo. Torajans believe that the dead can take their possessions with them to the afterlife, the effigies are usually equipped with small possessions. Traditionally, the effigies were simply carved, only to show the gender of the deceased. However, they have become more and more elaborate, actually attempting to imitate the likeness of the deceased. Nowadays, Tau tau has a photographic likeness to the people they represent.

Sculpture

Indonesia has a long history of stone, bronze and Iron Ages arts. Indonesia has a rich history of Hindu–Buddhist sculpture and architecture that has been shaped by a complex fusion of local, indigenous culture combined with foreign customs. Some Indonesian artifacts made from gold and bronze dating back to the 10th century are exhibited in the US. The megalithic sculptures can be found in numerous archaeological sites in Sumatra, Java to Sulawesi. The native Indonesians tribes have their own distinct tribal sculpture styles, usually created to depict ancestors, deities and animals. The stone sculpture artform particularly flourished in 8th-to-10th-century Java and Bali, which demonstrate the influences of Hindu-Buddhist culture, both as stand-alone works of art and also incorporated into temples. The most notable sculpture of the classical Hindu-Buddhist era of Indonesia are the hundreds of meters of relief and hundreds of stone buddhas at the temple of Borobudur in central Java. Approximately two miles of exquisite relief sculpture tell the story of the life of Buddha and illustrate his teachings. The temple was originally home to 504 statues of the seated Buddha.

The examples of notable Indonesian Hindu-Buddhist sculptures are; the statues of Hindu deities; Shiva, Vishnu, Brahma, Durga, Ganesha and Agastya enthroned in rooms of Prambanan temples, the Vishnu mounting Garuda statue of king Airlangga, the exquisite statue of Eastern Javanese Prajnaparamita and 3.7 meters tall Dvarapala dated from Singhasari period, and also the grand statue of Bhairava Adityawarman discovered in Sumatra. Today, the Hindu-Buddhist style stone sculptures are reproduced in villages in Muntilan near Borobudur also in Trowulan the former capital site of Majapahit in East Java, and Bali, and sold as a garden or pool ornament statues for homes, offices and hotels.

The walls of candi also often displayed bas-reliefs, either serve as decorative elements as well as to convey religious symbolic meanings; through describing narrative bas-reliefs. The most exquisite of the temple bas-reliefs can be found in Hindu and Buddhist temples. The first four terraces of Borobudur walls are showcases for bas-relief sculptures. These are exquisite, considered to be the most elegant and graceful in the ancient Buddhist world. The Buddhist scriptures describes as bas-reliefs in Borobudur such as Karmavibhangga (the law of karma), Lalitavistara (the birth of Buddha), Jataka, Avadana and Gandavyuha. While in Prambanan the Hindu scriptures is describes in its bas-relief panels; the Ramayana and Bhagavata Purana (popularly known as Krishnayana).

The bas-reliefs in Borobudur depicted many scenes of daily life in 8th-century ancient Java, from the courtly palace life, hermit in the forest, to those of commoners in the village. It also depicted a temple, marketplace, various flora and fauna, and also native vernacular architecture. People depicted here are the images of king, queen, princes, noblemen, courtier, soldier, servant, commoners, priest and hermit. The reliefs also depicted mythical spiritual beings in Buddhist beliefs such as asuras, gods, boddhisattvas, kinnaras, gandharvas and apsaras. The images depicted on bas-relief often served as a reference for historians to research certain subjects, such as the study of architecture, weaponry, economy, fashion, and also the mode of transportation of 8th-century Maritime Southeast Asia. One of the famous renderings of an 8th-century Southeast Asian double outrigger ship is Borobudur Ship.

Architecture

For centuries, Indonesian vernacular architecture has shaped settlements in Indonesia which commonly took the form of timber structures built on stilts dominated by a large roof. The most dominant foreign influences on Indonesian architecture were Indian, although European influences have been particularly strong since the 19th century and modern architecture in Indonesia is international in scope.

As in much of Southeast Asia, traditional vernacular architecture in Indonesia is built on stilts, with the significant exceptions of Java and Bali. Notable stilt houses are those of the Dayak people in Borneo, the Rumah Gadang of the Minangkabau people in western Sumatra, the Rumah Bolon of the Batak people in northern Sumatra, and the Tongkonan of the Toraja people in Sulawesi. Oversized saddle roofs with large eaves, such as the homes of the Batak and the tongkonan of Toraja, are often bigger than the house they shelter. The fronts of Torajan houses are frequently decorated with buffalo horns, stacked one above another, as an indication of status. The outside walls also frequently feature decorative reliefs.

Candi is an Indonesian term to refer to ancient temples. Before the rise of Islam, between the 5th to 15th-century Dharmic faiths (Hinduism and Buddhism) were the majority in the Indonesian archipelago, especially in Java and Sumatra. As a result of numerous Hindu temples, locally known as candi, constructed and dominated the landscape of Java. According to local beliefs, Java valley had thousands of Hindu temples that co-existed with Buddhist temples, most of which were buried in the massive eruption of Mount Merapi in 1006 AD.

Between 1100 and 1500 additional Hindu temples were built, but abandoned by Hindus and Buddhists as Islam spread in Java circa the 15th to 16th century. The 8th-century Borobudur temple near Yogyakarta is the largest Buddhist temple in the world and is notable for incorporating about 2,672 relief panels and 504 Buddha statues into its structure, telling the story of the life of the Buddha. As the visitor ascends through the eight levels of the temple, the story unfolds, the final three levels simply containing stupas and statues of the Buddha. The building is said to incorporate a map of the Buddhist cosmos and is a masterful fusion of didactic narrative relief, spiritual symbolism, monumental design and the serene meditative environs. The whole monument itself resembles a giant stupa, but seen from above it forms a mandala.

The nearby 9th-century temple complex at Prambanan contains some of the best-preserved examples of Hindu temple architecture in Java. The temple complex comprises eight main shrines, surrounded by 224 smaller shrines. The majority of Hindu temples in Java were dedicated to Shiva, who Javanese Hindus considered as the God who commands the energy to destroy, recombine and recreate the cycle of life. Small temples were often dedicated to Shiva and his family (wife Durga, son Ganesha). Larger temple complexes include temples for Vishnu and Brahma, but the most majestic, sophisticated and central temple was dedicated to Shiva.

Crafts

Indonesia is considered as home of world handicraft. Every ethnic group has its own uniqueness, style, and philosophy of crafting. Most of them are made from wooden, bone, fabric, stone, and paper. These natural materials were crafted using hands into
profitable and aesthetic items. Handicraft manufacturing serves not only as an important economic sector, but also a tradition and has a social function as well. The handicraft industry employs thousands of people in towns and villages across the country. About half a billion dollar worth of handicraft is exported every year, and many more is consumed domestically.

There are many varieties of handicraft from other regions. West Sumatra and South Sumatra are particularly noted for their songket cloths. Villages in the Lesser Sunda Islands produce ikat while provinces in Kalimantan are long known for their basketry and weaving using rattan and other natural fabrics. Wood art produced by the Asmat people of Papua is highly valued. Cities along Java's northern coast, Cirebon, Pekalongan, and Rembang are known as centres of batik. Cirebon and Jepara are important cities in furniture, producing rattan and carved wood respectively, while Tasikmalaya is known for embroidery. Pasuruan also produces furniture and other products and support stores
and galleries in Bali. Bandung and Surabaya, both modern, cosmopolitan, and industrialised cities—much like Jakarta but on a lesser scale—are creative cities with a variety of innovative startups.

Several Indonesian islands are famous for their batik, ikat and songket cloth. Once on the brink of disappearing, batik and later ikat, found a new lease on life when former President Suharto promoted wearing batik shirts on official occasions. In addition to the traditional patterns with their special meanings, used for particular occasions, batik designs have become creative and diverse over the last few years.

Other noted Indonesian crafts are Jepara wood carving and Kris. In 2005, UNESCO recognised Kris as one of Masterpiece of the Oral and Intangible Heritage of Humanity from Indonesia.

In 2012, Noken was listed in the UNESCO Intangible Cultural Heritage Lists as a cultural heritage of Indonesia. Women carrying noken are still a common sight in Wamena.

Being the best-known Indonesian sailing-vessel, Phinisi became the tagline for the 2017 inscription of ''The Art of Boatbuilding in South Sulawesi'' in the UNESCO's Representative List of the Intangible Cultural Heritage of Humanity.

Clothing

Indonesia's best-known national costumes are Batik and kebaya, although initially these costumes originated mainly from Javanese and Balinese culture, which are most prominent in Javanese, Sundanese and Balinese cultures. Because Java has become the political centre and population of Indonesia, the island's folk costume has been raised to national status. As a plural country, Indonesia has 34 provinces, each of which has representatives of traditional clothing from each province with unique and different designs. National costumes are worn at official occasions and traditional ceremonies. each province in Indonesia – more complete each group in Indonesia, has its own traditional costumes. The costumes of this area are in Indonesian called Pakaian tradisional or Pakaian adat, and are taken from traditional Indonesian textile traditions and crafts.

National costumes

Batik

Batik is a cloth that is traditionally made using a manual wax-resist dyeing technique to form intricate patterns. Traditionally batik cloth is a large piece of intricately decorated cloth used by Javanese women as kemben or torso wrap. Batik cloth was wrapped around the hips with multiple folds in front called wiron, while the upper torso wear kebaya fitted dress. Traditionally for men, the edge of batik cloth also can be sewn together to make a tubular cloth as sarong, or wrapped around hips as kain in a fashion similar to women's. Later for men, the batik cloth also is sewn and made into contemporary batik men's shirt. Today, Batik shirts, which are commonly worn by men in Indonesia (especially in Java), are usually worn during formal occasions; such as attending weddings, traditional ceremonies, formal meetings, communal gatherings, etc. Batik is recognized as one of the important identity of Indonesian culture. UNESCO designated Indonesian batik as a Masterpiece of Oral and Intangible Heritage of Humanity on 2 October 2009.

Kebaya
The kebaya is the national costume of women from Indonesia, although it is more accurately endemic to the Javanese, Sundanese and Balinese peoples. It is sometimes made from sheer material such as silk, thin cotton or semi-transparent nylon or polyester, adorned with brocade or floral pattern embroidery. Kebaya usually worn with a sarong or batik kain panjang, or other traditional woven garment such as ikat, songket with a colorful motif. Kebaya is usually worn during official national events by Indonesian first lady, wives of Indonesian diplomats, and Indonesian ladies. It also worn by Indonesian ladies attending traditional ceremonies and weddings. During Balinese traditional ceremonies, Balinese women wore colorful Balinese style kebaya with songket Bali.

Peci
The Peci, also known as songkok or kopiah, is a cap traditionally worn by male Muslims in the Indonesian archipelago. It is quite similar to the Turkish-Egyptian fez. In Indonesia, the black velvet peci has become the national headdress with nationalist connotations made popular by Sukarno. A number of Indonesian nationalist movement activists in the early 20th century, wore a peci to convey their nationalistic sentiments and to demonstrate their Indonesian identity. Indonesian male presidents always wear a peci as part of their official presidential attire. Since then, the black velvet peci is approved to be the national head-dress for Indonesian men. It is worn all over Indonesia, especially by government officials and men (usually Muslim men) throughout the country. The peci is usually worn with a batik shirt or western-style suits by men in Indonesia for those attending formal occasions.

Foods

The cuisine of indonesia has been influenced by Chinese culture and Indian culture, as well as by Western culture. However, in return, Indonesian cuisine has also contributed to the cuisines of neighbouring countries, notably Malaysia and Singapore, where Padang or Minangkabau cuisine from West Sumatra is very popular. Also, Satay (Sate in Indonesian), which originated from Java, Madura, and Sumatra, has gained popularity as a street vendor food from Singapore to Thailand. In the 15th century, both the Portuguese and Arab traders arrived in Indonesia with the intention of trading for pepper and other spices. During the colonial era, immigrants from many countries arrived in Indonesia and brought different cultures as well as cuisines.

Most native Indonesians eat rice as the main dish, with a wide range of vegetables and meat as side dishes. However, in some parts of the country, such as Irian Jaya and Ambon, the majority of the people eat sago (a type of tapioca) and sweet potato.

The most important aspect of modern Indonesian cuisine is that food must be halal, conforming to Islamic food laws. Haraam, the opposite of halal, includes pork and alcohol. However, in some regions where there is a significant non-Muslim population, non-halal foods are also commonly served.

Indonesian dishes are usually spicy, using a wide range of chilli peppers and spices. The most popular dishes include nasi goreng (fried rice), Satay, Nasi Padang (a dish of Minangkabau) and soy-based dishes, such as tofu and tempe. A unique characteristic of some Indonesian food is the application of spicy peanut sauce in their dishes, as a dressing for Gado-gado or Karedok (Indonesian style salad), or for seasoning grilled chicken satay. Another unique aspect of Indonesian cuisine is using terasi or belacan, a pungent shrimp paste in dishes of sambal oelek (hot pungent chilli sauce). The sprinkling of fried shallots also gives a uniquely crisp texture to some Indonesian dishes.

Chinese and Indian cultures have influenced the serving of food and the types of spices used. It is very common to find Chinese food in Indonesia such as Dim Sum and noodles, and Indian cuisine such as Tandoori chicken. In addition, Western culture has significantly contributed to the extensive range of dishes. However, the dishes have been transformed to suit Indonesian tastes. For example, steaks are usually served with rice. Popular fast foods such as Kentucky Fried Chicken are served with rice instead of bread and sambal (spicy sauce) instead of ketchup. Some Indonesian foods have been adopted by the Dutch, like Indonesian rice table or 'rijsttafel'.

Mythology and folklores

The mythology of Indonesia is very diverse, the Indonesian people consisting of hundreds of ethnic groups, each with their own myths and legends. The stories within this system of lore often incorporate supernatural entities and magical creatures which form parts of Indonesian mythology. Others relate to creation myths and place naming legends that are often intertwined with historical figures and events. Ancient rituals for healing and traditional medicine as well as complex philosophies regarding health and disease can also be found.

These native mythologies are relatively free from foreign influences, such as Torajans, Nias, Bataks, Dayaks and Papuans. By contrast, Javanese, Balinese, and to some degree Sundanese were influenced by Hindu-Buddhist Indian mythology as early as the 1st century CE. Hindu gods, legends and epics such as Ramayana and Mahabharata were adopted and adapted into a uniquely local form.

Hindu-Buddhist mythical beings have a role in Javanese and Balinese mythology, including Hindu gods and heroes, devatas, asuras, apsaras (known as hapsari or bidadari), kinnaras, etc., while native gods of nature such as Semar, Dewi Sri, and Nyai Loro Kidul are either given identified as their Hindu counterpart or incorporated into a Java-Bali Hindu pantheon unknown in India. For example, native rice goddess Dewi Sri is identified with Lakshmi the shakti of Vishnu, and Semar and his sons the Punakawans are incorporated into the epic of Mahabharata in Javanese wayang kulit, as the clown servants of the Pandawas. Several names refer to gods, such as Dewa (devas), Dewi (devi), dewata (devatas), and in native traditions usually referred to as Batara (male god) and Batari (female goddess).

After the coming of Islam to the Indonesian archipelago, Islamic mythology especially those dealing with spiritual beings, such as devils, demons, jinns and angels entered Indonesian mythology. In Sumatra, Malay, Aceh and Minangkabau mythology was almost entirely supplanted by Islamic mythology. However, belief in local spirits such as the forest guardian, the ghost of water or haunted places still exists, often associated with a jinn or the tormented soul of a deceased human.

Literature

Early Indonesian literature originates in Malay literature, and the influence of these roots was felt until well into the twentieth century. The phrase "Indonesian literature" refers to Indonesian as written in the nation of Indonesia, but also covers literature written in an earlier form of the language, i.e. the Malay language written in the Dutch East Indies. Pramoedya Ananta Toer was Indonesia's most internationally celebrated author, having won the Magsaysay Award as well as being considered for the Nobel Prize in Literature. Other important figures include the late Chairil Anwar, a poet and member of the "Generation 45" group of authors who were active in the Indonesian independence movement. Tight information controls during Suharto's presidency suppressed new writing, especially because of its ability to agitate for social reform.

In the book Max Havelaar, Dutch author Multatuli criticised the Dutch treatment of the Indonesians, which gained him international attention.

Modern Indonesian authors include Seno Gumira Adjidarma, Andrea Hirata, Habiburrahman El Shirazy, Ayu Utami, Gus tf Sakai, Eka Kurniawan, Ratih Kumala, Dee, Oka Rusmini. Some of their works have translated to other languages.

Poetry has a long tradition in Indonesia, particularly among ethnically Malay populations, of extemporary, interactive, oral composition of poetry. These poems are referred to as pantun. Contemporary Indonesian poets include among others, Sutardji Calzoum Bachri, Rendra, Taufiq Ismail, Afrizal Malna, Binhad Nurrohmat, Joko Pinurbo, Sapardi Djoko Damono. In written poetry and prose, a number of traditional forms dominate, mainly: syair (traditional narrative poetry), gurindam (brief aphorisms), hikayat (stories, fairy-tales, animal fables, chronicles), babad (histories or chronicles).

On 15 December 2020 the Pantun is recognized as a Masterpiece of the Oral and Intangible Heritage of Humanity by UNESCO (United Nations Educational, Scientific and Cultural Organization).

Recreation and sports

Many traditional games are still preserved and popular in Indonesia, although western culture has influenced some parts of them. Among three hundred officially recognised Indonesian cultures, there are many kinds of traditional games: cockfighting in Bali, annual bull races in Madura, and stone jumping in Nias. Stone jumping involves leaping over a stone wall about up to 1.5 m high and was originally used to train warriors. Pencak Silat is another popular form of sport, which was influenced by Asian culture as a whole. Another form of national sport is sepak takraw. The rules are similar to volleyball: to keep the rattan ball in the air with the players' feet.

Popular modern sports in Indonesia played at the international level include football (soccer), badminton and basketball. Badminton is one of Indonesia's most successful sports. Indonesian badminton athletes have played in Indonesia Open Badminton Championship, All England Open Badminton Championships, and many international events, including the Summer Olympics and won Olympic gold medals since badminton was made an Olympic sport in 1992. Rudy Hartono is a legendary Indonesian badminton player, who won All England titles seven times in a row (1968 through 1974). Indonesian teams have won the Thomas Cup (men's world team championship) thirteen of the twenty-two times that it has been contested since they entered the series in 1957. In the internationally popular sport of football (soccer), Indonesian teams have been active in the Asian Football Confederation (AFC).

Sporting events in Indonesia are organised by the National Sports Committee of Indonesia (KONI). The committee, along with the government of Indonesia, has set a National Sports Day every 9 September with "Sports for All" as the motto. Indonesia has hosted the Southeast Asian Games four times, in 1979, 1987, 1997 and 2011, and won the overall champion title in each of these years. As of 2011, Indonesia has won champion titles 10 times overall out of 18 SEA Games it has attended since debuted in 1977. The country also hosted the 1993 Asian Basketball Championship. Besides that, it has also hosted the Asian Games twice, the 1962 Asian Games and the 2018 Asian Games.

Popular media

Cinema

The largest chain of cinemas in Indonesia is 21 Cineplex, which has cinemas spread throughout twenty-four cities on the major islands of Indonesia. Many smaller independent cinemas also exist.

In the 1980s, the film industry in Indonesia was at its peak, and dominated the cinemas in Indonesia with movies that have retained a high reputation, such as Catatan Si Boy and Blok M and actors like Onky Alexander, Meriam Bellina, Nike Ardilla and Paramitha Rusady. The film Tjoet Nja' Dhien (1988) winning 9 Citra Awards at the 1988 Indonesian Film Festival. It was also the first Indonesian movie chosen for screening at the Cannes Film Festival, where it was awarded Best International Film in 1989. However, the film industry failed to continue its successes in the 1990s, when the number of movies produced decreased significantly, from 115 movies in 1990 to just 37 in 1993. As a result, most movies produced in the 1990s contained adult themes. The industry started to recover in the late 1990s, with the rise of independent directors and many new movies produced, such as Garin Nugroho's Cinta dalam Sepotong Roti, Riri Riza and Mira Lesmana's Petualangan Sherina and Arisan! by Nia Dinata. Another form of recovery is the re-establishment of the Indonesian Film Festival (FFI), inactive for twelve years, and the creation of the Jakarta International Film Festival. Daun di Atas Bantal (1998) received Asia Pacific Film Festival in Taipei.

Television

Radio
The public radio network Radio Republik Indonesia (RRI) was founded in 1945. It consists of a network of regional stations located in all provinces of the archipelago. In most cities and large towns there are also many commercial stations. Since 2006, several digital radio stations have been based in Jakarta and Surabaya, using Digital Audio Broadcasting (DAB) and Hybrid HD-Radio.

Religion and philosophy

Islam is Indonesia's main religion, with almost 88% of Indonesians declared Muslim according to the 2000 census, making Indonesia the most populous Muslim-majority nation in the world. The remaining population is 9% Christian (of which roughly two-thirds are Protestant with the remainder mainly Catholic, and a large minority Charismatic), 2% Hindu, and 1% Buddhist.

The Pancasila, the statement of two principles that encapsulate the ideology of the Indonesian state, affirms that  "The state shall be based on the belief in the one and only God".

Celebrations

See also 

 Demographics of Indonesia
 List of museums and cultural institutions in Indonesia
 National Intangible Cultural Heritage of Indonesia

References

Further reading
 Kuncaraningrat. (1985) Javanese culture Singapore: Oxford University Press,